Lesser Festivals are a type of observance in the Anglican Communion, including the Church of England, considered to be less significant than a Principal Feast, Principal Holy Day, or Festival, but more significant than a Commemoration. Whereas Principal Feasts must be celebrated, it is not obligatory to observe Lesser Festivals. They are always attached to a calendar date, and are not observed if they fall on a Sunday, in Holy Week, or in Easter Week. In Common Worship each Lesser Festival is provided with a collect and an indication of liturgical colour.

Lesser Festivals in the Church of England
Source: C of E website.

January
2 January: Basil the Great and Gregory of Nazianzus, Bishops, Teachers of the Faith, 379 and 389
12 January: Aelred of Hexham, Abbot of Rievaulx, 1167
13 January: Hilary, Bishop of Poitiers, Teacher of the Faith, 367
17 January: Antony of Egypt, Hermit, Abbot, 356
19 January: Wulfstan, Bishop of Worcester, 1095
21 January: Agnes, Child Martyr at Rome, 304
24 January: Francis de Sales, Bishop of Geneva, Teacher of the Faith, 1622
26 January: Timothy and Titus, Companions of Paul
28 January: Thomas Aquinas, Priest, Philosopher, Teacher of the Faith, 1274
30 January: Charles, King and Martyr, 1649

February
3 February: Anskar, Archbishop of Hamburg, Missionary in Denmark and Sweden, 865
14 February: Cyril and Methodius, Missionaries to the Slavs, 869 and 885
17 February: Janani Luwum, Archbishop of Uganda, Martyr, 1977
23 February: Polycarp, Bishop of Smyrna, Martyr, c 155
27 February: George Herbert, Priest, Poet, 1633

Other examples
17 March: Patrick, Bishop, Missionary, Patron of Ireland, c 460
10 April: William Law, Priest, Spiritual Writer, 1761
20 May: Alcuin of York, Deacon, Abbot of Tours, 804
30 May: Josephine Butler, social reformer, 1906
16 June: Richard, Bishop of Chichester, 1253
11 July: Benedict of Nursia, Abbot of Monte Cassino, Father of Western Monasticism, c 550
20 August: Bernard, Abbot of Clairvaux, Teacher of the Faith, 1153
13 September: John Chrysostom, Bishop of Constantinople, Teacher of the Faith, 407
25 September: Lancelot Andrewes, overseer of the King James Version of the Bible
4 October: Francis of Assisi, Friar, Deacon, Founder of the Friars Minor, 1226
26 October: Alfred the Great, King of the West Saxons, Scholar, 899
20 November: Edmund, King of the East Angles, Martyr, 870
13 December: Lucy, Martyr at Syracuse, 304

See also

List of Anglican Church calendars
Principal Feast
Principal Holy Day
Festival (Anglicanism)
Commemoration (Anglicanism)

References

Citations

Sources 

 Common Worship - Daily Prayer
 Oremus (Let us pray) web site

Church of England festivals